Keith Slater (born 1936) is a former Western Australian cricketer.

Keith Slater (bishop) (born 1949), Australian bishop
Keith Slater (rugby league) (fl. 1960s–1970s), English rugby league footballer
Keith Slatter (fl. 1960s), English rugby league footballer